'Tuljapur Assembly constituency is one of the Maharashtra Vidhan Sabha (legislative assembly) constituencies, in Maharashtra state in western India.

Overview
Tuljapur (constituency number 241) is one of the four Vidhan Sabha constituencies located in the Osmanabad district. It covers the entire Tuljapur tehsil and part of the Osmanabad tehsil of this district. The number of electors in 2009 was 298,290 (male 159,017, female 139,273).

Tuljapur is part of the Osmanabad Lok Sabha constituency along with five other Vidhan Sabha segments, namely Paranda, Umarga and Osmanabad in Osmanabad district, Barshi in the Solapur district and Ausa in the Latur district.

Members of Legislative Assembly

Election Results

2014 Vidhan Sabha
 Madhukarrao Chavan (Congress) : 70,701 votes
 Gore Jeevanrao Vishwanathrao (NCP) : 41,091
 Sanjay Nimbalkar (BJP) : 36,380

1962 Vidhan Sabha
 Sahebrao Dadarao (INC) : 20,095  
 Devidas Nagoba (PWP) : 15,404

See also
 List of constituencies of Maharashtra Vidhan Sabha
 Tuljapur

References

Assembly constituencies of Maharashtra
Osmanabad district